House of 9 is a 2004 psychological horror film directed by Steven R. Monroe and starring Dennis Hopper and Kelly Brook. It follows nine strangers who have been abducted and locked inside a house. A mysterious voice called The Watcher (voiced by Jim Carter) tells them that they are to play a game: the last person alive can leave the house and win five million dollars. The film is presented with "live feeds" from hidden surveillance cameras, showing the nine people turning from cooperative escape attempts to a killing fest.

House of 9 premiered at the Cannes Film Festival on 20 May 2004.

Plot
Surveillance camera footage shows views of a mansion and its rooms; the views alternate among images of nine people being kidnapped. Lea, an abductee, wakes up in a bedroom. She notices others in nearby bedrooms, and runs to the main door, bangs at it, and shouts to be let out. She finds the windows are all walled with bricks; even the basement door is blocked. She has a panic attack and passes out.

Lea is awakened by Father Duffy, a priest who is with a group of seven people. A voice comes over a speaker which announces they are gathered to play a game. Their friends and family are being "taken care of", so they won't be found. Also, they were chosen "not based on who they are, but what they are". It is like a reality show, only much graver: the rules are that the winner is the last one left alive; he or she would then be freed, and also receive compensation of five million U.S. dollars.

The players discuss the situation. They try to break down the door using a dining table as a battering ram, and then try to dig and break through other holes, but nothing works. A sound from the kitchen reveals a dumbwaiter with food.

In the dining room, the players introduce themselves. Father Duffy is a priest. Jay is a cop with a pistol. Lea is a dancer. Claire is a tennis player. Francis is a musician, and Cynthia is his wife. Al B is an ambitious rapper who covets Jay's gun, and assumes anything said about him is racially motivated. Shona is a drug addict with an ankle bracelet monitor; some players hope that this may attract outside help. Max Roy is a clothes designer.

After dinner, the players choose bedrooms. Cynthia and Francis take one, and Duffy gets his own; the others share. Jay and Lea talk about their families, until someone sneaks in and tries to steal Jay's gun. Jay and Lea foil the attempt and assemble everyone in the hallway where they all argue. Afterwards, Jay tells Lea that he only trusts her and Duffy.

The players open a wine cabinet and have drinks, except for Duffy, who returns to his room. Lea goes for a walk and Jay sits at his bed. Francis leaves with a glass stopper; he breaks it in the bathroom, and hides some shards under the toilet tank lid. Shona, Claire and Max get drunk. Al B flirts and dances with Cynthia, until Francis arrives. The two men fight, but when Cynthia intervenes, Al B pushes her and knocks the back of her head against the stone railing, which causes her death. Jay "arrests" Al B, and locks him in a room using a pipe to hold the door shut.

The players are shocked at Cynthia's death. Al B screams to be let out. Duffy brings him food, but he escapes and attacks Jay with the pipe; he beats him to a pulp. With his dying breath, Jay gives Duffy his gun. Al B slowly backs into the room and shuts the door.

The next day, the six remaining players find food and wine, along with a card that says "Good work". They run to Al B's room and find that he has hanged himself. Duffy and Lea stand in shock, while the other players leave to eat. Francis retreats and show signs of a mental breakdown. Shona and Claire argue, and it escalates to the point where Claire kills Shona. Meanwhile, Francis goes after Lea, who is washing her face in the bathroom. He rips the light fixture from the wall and throws it into the sink, electrocuting her.

Claire tells Duffy that she killed Shona in self-defense. Duffy leaves to look for Lea, and finds her on the bathroom floor. Francis arrives, and pretends to act surprised. Meanwhile, Claire goes to get food, but sees Max. She offers to form an alliance with him; he accepts. Francis attacks Duffy with the assumption he would not retaliate with the gun, but Duffy shoots him in the stomach. As Claire turns around to the sound, Max wraps his belt around her neck. Duffy returns to the foyer and sees Max strangle Claire. Max explains that "she was stealing food", but refuses Duffy's pleas to stop. Duffy shoots Max in the head.

The gunshot awakens Lea, who survived the electrocution. She barricades the door and rushes to the shower, but knocks the toilet lid and discovers the glass shards that Francis hid. She tears a shower curtain and wraps it around one of the shards. Duffy asks Claire if she is okay, but he is stabbed in the back by Francis, and he drops the gun. Francis retrieves it and shoots Claire. Duffy pleads for his life, but Francis uses the last round to shoot him. He then declares victory, repeatedly shouting "I Win!"

Upstairs, Lea makes a commotion when she fumbles with the toilet cover. Francis hears the noise and heads upstairs. Lea hides under the bed when Francis walks in the room. After seeing that Lea is no longer in the bathroom, he spots her, and toys with her briefly before pulling her out. In the ensuing struggle, Lea stabs Francis in the leg with the shard, and runs to a balcony. Francis charges her, and they flip over the railing. Lea lands on top of Francis, but when she gets up, she realizes the shard had pierced Francis in the heart.

The front door opens, revealing a bright light, and a bag on the floor. Lea walks to the door, picks up the bag, and leaves.

Alternate endings
The DVD includes two alternate endings.

In the first ending, as Lea steps into the light, she is knocked unconscious, and wakes up in her apartment bed. She notices the bag, a small TV set and a videotape. She opens the bag and sees a pile of cash. She plays the tape, and sees the camera footage of the foyer (all the bodies are gone and everything is cleaned up). The Watcher says she just became a member of the world's most exclusive survival club, and that he is very proud. The picture then goes to the bedrooms where there are nine new people passed out on the floor. Lea stares at the screen in shock as The Watcher says, "Happy viewing..."

In the second "originally intended" ending, as Lea leaves the house, she is led into another house where she meets four people. Each of them has a bag of money. The camera zooms in on Lea; a fearful look grows as she realizes that the game is not over.

Cast
 Dennis Hopper - Father Duffy
 Kelly Brook - Lea
 Hippolyte Girardot - Francis
 Susie Amy - Claire Leevy
 Morven Christie - Shona
 Peter Capaldi - Max Roy
 Asher D - Al B
 Raffaello Degruttola- Jay
 Julienne Davis - Cynthia
 Jim Carter - The Watcher (voice)

Production 
Filming for House of 9 took place in Romania.

Reception
House of 9 received mixed reviews from critics and audiences. An especially harsh review from the web site Film Verdicts called the film "preposterous pretentiousness".  Dread Central said, "House of 9 does what it sets out to do, and that’s to deliver to its viewers a movie that sucks you in until you cannot breathe." DVD Talk said, "See it for the hotties, for the nasty kill scenes, and for the always-insane Dennis Hopper at his most adorably weird." The Hartford Courant reviewed the film, noting that "As with ``Saw II'' (and almost any slasher movie these days), the killings become tedious, something to be endured so you can see how it ends."

Home media
The DVD was released on 14 February 2006 in the US.

References

External links
 
 
 

2004 films
2004 psychological thriller films
British mystery thriller films
British psychological thriller films
Films about death games
English-language French films
English-language German films
English-language Romanian films
Films about kidnapping
Films about murder
Films directed by Steven R. Monroe
Films shot in Bucharest
French mystery films
French psychological thriller films
2000s French-language films
German mystery films
German psychological thriller films
2000s mystery thriller films
Romanian thriller films
2000s British films
2000s French films
2000s German films